James Amyatt (1734–1813), of Freemantle, Hampshire was an English politician who sat in the House of Commons between 1774 and 1806.

Amyatt was the second son. of Benjamin Amyatt of Totnes and was baptized on 18 July 1734. He is said to have become a captain in the service of the East India Company. He became a free merchant in India. He married  Maria Amyatt widow of Peter Amyatt of the council of Calcutta, and daughter  of Rev. W. Wollaston of Norfolk.
 
At the 1774 general election he was elected Member of Parliament for Totnes in a contest. In 1784 he was elected MP for Southampton and held the seat until 1806.

References

1734 births
1813 deaths
Members of the Parliament of Great Britain for Southampton
Members of the Parliament of Great Britain for Totnes
British MPs 1774–1780
British MPs 1784–1790
British MPs 1790–1796
British MPs 1796–1800
Members of the Parliament of the United Kingdom for Southampton
UK MPs 1801–1802
UK MPs 1802–1806